Mstislav Leopoldovich Rostropovich (27 March 192727 April 2007) was a Russian cellist and conductor. In addition to his interpretations and technique, he was well known for both inspiring and commissioning new works, which enlarged the cello repertoire more than any cellist before or since. He inspired and premiered over 100 pieces, forming long-standing friendships and artistic partnerships with composers including Dmitri Shostakovich, Sergei Prokofiev, Henri Dutilleux, Witold Lutosławski, Olivier Messiaen, Luciano Berio, Krzysztof Penderecki, Alfred Schnittke, Norbert Moret, Andreas Makris, Leonard Bernstein, Aram Khachaturian and Benjamin Britten.

Rostropovich was internationally recognized as a staunch advocate of human rights, and was awarded the 1974 Award of the International League of Human Rights. He was married to the soprano Galina Vishnevskaya and had two daughters, Olga and Elena Rostropovich. He's a recipient of numerous prestigious musical accolades, including a Polar Music Prize.

Early years

Mstislav Rostropovich was born in Baku, Azerbaijan SSR, to parents who had moved from Orenburg: , a renowned cellist and former student of Pablo Casals, and Sofiya Nikolaevna Fedotova-Rostropovich, a talented pianist. The Polish part of his family bore the Bogoria coat of arms, which was located at the family palace in Skotniki.

Mstislav's mother, Sofiya, of Russian descent, was the daughter of musicians. Her elder sister, Nadezhda, married cellist Semyon Kozolupov, who was thus Rostropovich's uncle by marriage.

Rostropovich grew up in Baku and spent his youth there. During World War II his family moved back to Orenburg and then in 1943 to Moscow. 

At the age of four, Rostropovich learned the piano with his mother. He began the cello at the age of 10 with his father. In 1943, at the age of 16, he entered the Moscow Conservatory, where he studied cello with his uncle Semyon Kozolupov, and piano, conducting and composition with Vissarion Shebalin. His teachers also included Dmitri Shostakovich. In 1945, he came to prominence as a cellist when he won the gold medal in the Soviet Union's first ever competition for young musicians. He graduated from the Conservatory in 1948, and became professor of cello there in 1956.

First concerts
Rostropovich gave his first cello concert in 1942. He won first prize at the international Music Awards of Prague and Budapest in 1947, 1949 and 1950. In 1950, at the age of 23 he was awarded what was then considered the highest distinction in the Soviet Union, the Stalin Prize. At that time, Rostropovich was already well known in his country and while actively pursuing his solo career, he taught at the Leningrad (Saint-Petersburg) Conservatory and the Moscow Conservatory.
In 1955, he married Galina Vishnevskaya, a leading soprano at the Bolshoi Theatre.

Rostropovich had working relationships with Soviet composers of the era. In 1949 Sergei Prokofiev wrote his Cello Sonata in C, Op. 119, for the 22-year-old Rostropovich, who gave the first performance in 1950, with Sviatoslav Richter. Prokofiev also dedicated his Symphony-Concerto to him; this was premiered in 1952. Rostropovich and Dmitry Kabalevsky completed Prokofiev's Cello Concertino after the composer's death. Dmitri Shostakovich wrote both his first and second cello concertos for Rostropovich, who also gave their first performances.

His international career started in 1963 in the Conservatoire of Liège (with Kirill Kondrashin) and in 1964 in West Germany.

Rostropovich went on several tours in Western Europe and met several composers, including Benjamin Britten, who dedicated his Cello Sonata, three Solo Suites, and his Cello Symphony to Rostropovich. Rostropovich gave their first performances, and the two had an obviously special affinity – Rostropovich's family described him as "always smiling" when discussing "Ben", and on his death bed he was said to have expressed no fear as he and Britten would, he believed, be reunited in Heaven. 

Britten was also renowned as a pianist and together they recorded, among other works, Schubert's Sonata for Arpeggione and Piano in A minor. His daughter claimed that this recording moved her father to tears of joy even on his deathbed.

Rostropovich also had a long-standing artistic partnership with Henri Dutilleux (Tout un monde lointain... for cello and orchestra, Trois strophes sur le nom de Sacher for solo cello), Witold Lutosławski (Cello Concerto, Sacher-Variation for solo cello), Krzysztof Penderecki (cello concerto n°2, Largo for cello and orchestra, Per Slava for solo cello, sextet for piano, clarinet, horn, violin, viola and cello), Luciano Berio (Ritorno degli snovidenia for cello and thirty instruments, Les mots sont allés... for solo cello) as well as Olivier Messiaen (Concert à quatre for piano, cello, oboe, flute and orchestra).

Rostropovich took private lessons in conducting with Leo Ginzburg, and first conducted in public in Gorky in November 1962, performing the four entractes from Lady Macbeth of the Mtsensk District and Shostakovich's orchestration of Mussorgsky's Songs and Dances of Death with Vishnevskaya singing. 

In 1967, at the invitation of the Bolshoi Theatre's director Mikhail Chulaki, he conducted Tchaikovsky's opera Eugene Onegin at the Bolshoi, thus letting forth his passion for both the role of conductor and the opera.

August 1968 proms
Rostropovich played at The Proms on the night of 21 August 1968. He played with the Soviet State Symphony Orchestra – it was the orchestra's debut performance at the Proms. The programme featured Czech composer Antonín Dvořák's Cello Concerto in B minor and took place on the same day that the Warsaw Pact invaded Czechoslovakia to end Alexander Dubček's Prague Spring. After the performance, which had been preceded by heckling and demonstrations, the orchestra and soloist were cheered by the Proms audience. Rostropovich stood and held aloft the conductor's score of the Dvořák as a gesture of solidarity for the composer's homeland and the city of Prague.

Exile

Rostropovich fought for art without borders, freedom of speech, and democratic values, resulting in harassment from the Soviet regime. An early example was in 1948, when he was a student at the Moscow Conservatory. In response to the 10 February 1948 decree on so-called 'formalist' composers, his teacher Dmitri Shostakovich was dismissed from his professorships in Leningrad and Moscow; the 21-year-old Rostropovich quit the conservatory, dropping out in protest. Rostropovich also smuggled to the West the manuscript of Shostakovich’s Symphony No. 13, emphasizing Soviet indifference to the Babi Yar massacre.

In 1970, Rostropovich sheltered Aleksandr Solzhenitsyn, who otherwise would have had nowhere to go, in his own home. His friendship with Solzhenitsyn and his support for dissidents led to official disgrace in the early 1970s. As a result, Rostropovich was restricted from foreign touring, as was his wife, soprano Galina Vishnevskaya, and his appearances performing in Moscow were curtailed, as increasingly were his appearances in such major cities as Leningrad and Kiev.

Rostropovich left the Soviet Union in 1974 with his wife and children and settled in the United States. He was banned from touring his homeland with foreign orchestras and, in 1977, the Soviet leadership instructed musicians from the Soviet bloc not to take part in an international competition he had organised. In 1978, Rostropovich was deprived of his Soviet citizenship because of his public opposition to the Soviet Union's restriction of cultural freedom. He would not return to the Soviet Union until 1990.

Further career
On December 17, 1988, Rostropovich gave a special concert at Barbican Hall in London, after postponing a trip to India for the Armenian Earthquake relief program. The event was part of an effort called Musicians for Armenia, which was expected to raise more than $450,000 from donations worldwide, including gifts from musicians, concert proceeds and film and recording rights. Prince Charles and the Princess of Wales attended the concert in the sold-out 2,026-seat concert hall.

On February 7, 1989, a cello concert was organized by the Armenian Relief Society and the Volunteers Technical Assistance (VTA) for the victims of the Spitak Earthquake. At the concert, Rostropovich played his favorite cello repertoire, including Dvořák's Cello Concerto in B minor; Haydn's cello concerti in C and D; Prokofiev's Symphony-Concerto; the two cello concerti of Shostakovich, and others. The evening with Rostropovich raised awareness and helped hundreds of earthquake victims put food on their table. The concert was held at the Kennedy Center and over 2,300 were in attendance.

From 1977 until 1994, he was music director and conductor of the U.S. National Symphony Orchestra in Washington, D.C. while still performing with some of the most famous musicians such as Martha Argerich, Sviatoslav Richter and Vladimir Horowitz. He was also the director and founder of the Mstislav Rostropovich Baku International Festival and was a regular performer at the Aldeburgh Festival in the UK.

His impromptu performance during the fall of the Berlin Wall as events unfolded was reported throughout the world. His Soviet citizenship was restored in 1990. When, in August 1991, news footage was broadcast of tanks in the streets of Moscow, Rostropovich responded with a characteristically brave, impetuous and patriotic gesture: he bought a plane ticket to Japan on a flight that stopped at Moscow, talked his way out of the airport and went to join Boris Yeltsin in the hope that his fame might make some difference to the chance of tanks moving in. 
Rostropovich supported Yeltsin during the 1993 constitutional crisis and conducted the National Symphony Orchestra in Red Square at the height of the crackdown.

In 1993, he was instrumental in the foundation of the Kronberg Academy and was a patron until his death. He commissioned Rodion Shchedrin to compose the opera Lolita and conducted its premiere in 1994 at the Royal Swedish Opera. Rostropovich received many international awards, including the French Legion of Honor and honorary doctorates from many international universities. He was an activist, fighting for freedom of expression in art and politics. An ambassador for the UNESCO, he supported many educational and cultural projects. Rostropovich performed several times in Madrid and was a close friend of Queen Sofía of Spain.

With wife, Galina Vishnevskaya, he founded the Rostropovich-Vishnevskaya Foundation, a publicly supported non-profit 501(c)(3) organization based in Washington, D.C., in 1991 to improve the health and future of children in the former Soviet Union. The Rostropovich Home Museum opened on 4 March 2002, in Baku. The couple visited Azerbaijan occasionally. Rostropovich also presented cello master classes at the Azerbaijan State Conservatory. Together they formed a valuable art collection. In September 2007, when it was slated to be sold at auction by Sotheby's in London and dispersed, Russian billionaire Alisher Usmanov stepped forward and negotiated the purchase of all 450 lots in order to keep the collection together and bring it to Russia as a memorial to the great cellist's memory. Christie's reported that the buyer paid a "substantially higher" sum than the £20 million pre-sale estimate

In 2006, he was featured in Alexander Sokurov's documentary Elegy of a life: Rostropovich, Vishnevskaya.

Later life

Rostropovich's health declined in 2006, with the Chicago Tribune reporting rumours of unspecified surgery in Geneva and later treatment for what was reported as an aggravated ulcer. Russian President Vladimir Putin visited Rostropovich to discuss details of a celebration the Kremlin was planning for 27 March 2007, Rostropovich's 80th birthday. Rostropovich attended the celebration but was reportedly in frail health.

Though Rostropovich's last home was in Paris, he maintained residences in Moscow, Saint Petersburg, London, Lausanne, and Jordanville, New York. Rostropovich was admitted to a Paris hospital at the end of January 2007, but then decided to fly to Moscow, where he had been receiving care. On 6 February 2007 the 79-year-old Rostropovich was admitted to a hospital in Moscow. "He is just feeling unwell", Natalya Dolezhale, Rostropovich's secretary in Moscow, said. 

Asked if there was serious cause for concern about his health she said: "No, right now there is no cause whatsoever." She refused to specify the nature of his illness. The Kremlin said that President Putin had visited the musician on Monday in the hospital, which prompted speculation that he was in a serious condition. Dolezhale said the visit was to discuss arrangements for marking Rostropovich's 80th birthday. On 27 March 2007, Putin issued a statement praising Rostropovich.

He re-entered the Blokhin Russian Cancer Research Centre on 7 April 2007, where he was treated for intestinal cancer. He died on 27 April, aged 80.

On 28 April, Rostropovich's body lay in an open coffin at the Moscow Conservatory, where he once studied as a teenager, and was then moved to the Church of Christ the Saviour. Thousands of mourners, including Putin, bade farewell. Spain's Queen Sofia, French first lady Bernadette Chirac and President Ilham Aliyev of Azerbaijan, where Rostropovich was born, as well as Naina Yeltsina, the widow of Boris Yeltsin, were among those in attendance at the funeral on 29 April. Rostropovich was then buried in the Novodevichy Cemetery, the same cemetery where his friend Boris Yeltsin had been buried four days earlier.

Stature
Rostropovich was a huge influence on the younger generation of cellists. Many have openly acknowledged their debt to his example. In the Daily Telegraph, Julian Lloyd Webber called him "probably the greatest cellist of all time."

Rostropovich either commissioned or was the recipient of compositions by many composers including Dmitri Shostakovich, Sergei Prokofiev, Benjamin Britten, Henri Dutilleux, Olivier Messiaen, André Jolivet, Witold Lutosławski, Luciano Berio, Krzysztof Penderecki, Leonard Bernstein, Alfred Schnittke, Aram Khachaturian, Astor Piazzolla, Andreas Makris, Sofia Gubaidulina, Arthur Bliss, Colin Matthews and Lopes Graça. His commissions of new works enlarged the cello repertoire more than any previous cellist: he gave the premiere of 117 compositions.

Rostropovich is also well known for his interpretations of standard repertoire works, including Dvořák's Cello Concerto in B minor.

Between 1997 and 2001 he was intimately involved in the development and testing of the BACH.Bow, a curved bow designed by the cellist Michael Bach. In 2001 he invited Michael Bach for a presentation of his BACH.Bow to Paris (7th Concours de violoncelle Rostropovitch). In July 2011, the city of Moscow announced plans to erect a statue of Rostropovich in a central square, and the statue was unveiled in March 2012.

He was also a notably generous spirit. Seiji Ozawa relates an anecdote: on hearing of the death of the baby daughter of his friend the sumo wrestler Chiyonofuji, Rostropovich flew unannounced to Tokyo, took a -hour cab ride to Chiyonofuji's house and played his Bach sarabande outside, as his gesture of sympathy—then got back in the taxi and returned to the airport to fly back to Europe.

Rostropovich is included in the Russian-American Chamber of Fame of Congress of Russian Americans, which is dedicated to Russian immigrants who made outstanding contributions to American science or culture.

Awards and recognition
Rostropovich received about 50 awards during his life, including:

Russian Federation and USSR
 Order of Merit for the Fatherland;
1st class (24 February 2007) – for outstanding contribution to world music and many years of creative activity
2nd class (25 March 1997) – for services to the state and the great personal contribution to the world of music
 Medal Defender of a Free Russia (2 February 1993) – for courage and dedication shown during the defence of democracy and constitutional order of 19–21 August 1991
 Jubilee Medal "60 Years of Victory in the Great Patriotic War 1941-1945"
 Medal "For Valiant Labor. To commemorate the 100th anniversary of the birth of Vladimir Ilyich Lenin"
 Medal "For the Victory over Germany in the Great Patriotic War 1941–1945"
 Medal "For Valiant Labour in the Great Patriotic War 1941-1945"
 Medal "For the Development of Virgin Lands"
 Medal "In Commemoration of the 800th Anniversary of Moscow"
 People's Artist of the USSR
 People's Artist of the RSFSR (1964)
 Honoured Artist of the RSFSR (1955)
 State Prize of the Russian Federation (1995)
 Lenin Prize (1964)
 Stalin Prize (1951)
 Commemorative Medal for the 850th anniversary of Moscow

Other governmental awards
 Praemium Imperiale (1993)
 Austrian Cross of Honour for Science and Art, 1st class (2001)
 Heydar Aliyev Order (Azerbaijan, 2007)
 Order "Independence" (Azerbaijan, 3 March 2002)
 Order of "Glory" (Azerbaijan, 1998)
 Order de Mayo (Argentina, 1991)
 Order of Freedom (Argentina, 1994)
 Commander of the Order of the Liberator General San Martín (Argentina, 1994)
 Grand Cordon of the Order of Leopold (Belgium, 1989)
 Grand Cross of the Order of Merit of the Republic of Hungary (2003)
 Order of Francisco de Miranda (Venezuela, 1979)
 Grand Cross of the Order of Merit of the Federal Republic of Germany (2001)
 Commander of the Order of the Phoenix (Greece)
 Commander of the Order of the Dannebrog (Denmark, 1983)
 Commander of the Order of Isabella the Catholic (Spain, 1985)
 Commander of the Order of Charles III (Spain, 2004)
 Grand Officer of the Order of Merit of the Italian Republic (31 August 1984)
 Grand Officer of the National Order of the Cedar (Lebanon, 1997)
 Grand Officer of the Order of the Lithuanian Grand Duke Gediminas (Lithuania, 24 November 1995)
 January 13 Commemorative Medal (Lithuania, 10 June 1992)
 Commander of the Order of Merit of the Grand Duchy of Luxembourg (1999; previously Knight, 1982)
 Commander of the Order of Adolphe of Nassau (Luxembourg, 1991)
 Commander of the Order of Saint-Charles (Monaco, 1989)
 Commander of the Order of Cultural Merit (Monaco, November 1999)
 Commander of the Order of the Dutch Lion (Netherlands, 1989)
 Commander of the Order of Merit of the Republic of Poland (1997)
 Knight Grand Cross of the Order of Saint James of the Sword (Portugal)
 Order "For merits in the sphere of culture" (Romania, 2004)
 Queen Beatrix of the Netherlands awarded him the rare Medal for Art and Science (Dutch: "Eremedaille voor Kunst en Wetenschap") of the House-Order of Orange.
 Presidential Medal of Freedom (USA, 1987)
 Kennedy Center Honoree (USA, 1992)
 Knight of the Order of Brilliant Star (Taiwan, 1977)
 Knight of the Order of the Lion of Finland
 Grand Officer of the Legion of Honour (France, 1998; previously Commander, 1987, and Officer, 1981)
 Commander of the Order of Arts and Letters (France, 1975)
 Order of Arts and Letters (Sweden) (1984)
 National Order "For Merit" (Ecuador, 1993)
 Order of the Rising Sun, Gold and Silver Star (2nd class) (Japan, 2003)
 Sharaf Order (Order of Honor) of the Republic of Azerbaijan
 Honorary Knight Commander of the Order of the British Empire (1987)

Honorary citizenships
 Citizen of honor of Orenburg, Russia (1993)
 Citizen of honor of Vilnius, Lithuania (2000)

Honorary degrees
 Honorary Doctorate, University of British Columbia (1984)
 Honorary Doctor of Humane Letters (L.H.D.), Northern Illinois University (1989)
 Laurea ad honorem at the University of Bologna in Political Science (2006)

Competitive awards
 Grammy Award for Best Chamber Music Performance (1984): Mstislav Rostropovich & Rudolf Serkin for Brahms: Sonata for Cello and Piano in E Minor, Op. 38 and Sonata in F, Op. 99

Other awards
 Polar Music Prize (1995)
 Gold Medal of the Royal Philharmonic Society (1970)
 Ernst von Siemens Music Prize (1976)
 Sonning Award (1981; Denmark)
 Prince of Asturias Award (in the concord category), 1997 (jointly with Yehudi Menuhin)
 Konex Decoration granted by the Konex Foundation of Argentina in 2002.
 Wolf Prize in Arts (2004)
 Sanford Medal (Yale University)
 Honorary Membership of the Royal Academy of Music, London.
 Gold UNESCO Mozart Medal (2007)
 Roosevelt Institute's Four Freedoms Award for the Freedom of Speech (1992)

Notes

References

Sources
Wilson, Elizabeth, Mstislav Rostropovich: Cellist, Teacher, Legend. London: Faber & Faber, 2007.

Further reading
Mstislav Rostropovich and Galina Vishnevskaya. Russia, Music, and Liberty. Conversations with Claude Samuel, Amadeus Press, Portland (1995), 
Rostrospektive. Zum Leben und Werk von Mstislaw Rostropowitsch. On the Life and Achievement of Mstislav Rostropovich, Alexander Ivashkin and Josef Oehrlein, Internationale Kammermusik-Akademie Kronberg, Schweinfurt: Maier (1997), 
Inside the Recording Studio. Working with Callas, Rostropovich, Domingo, and the Classical Elite, Peter Andry, with Robin Stringer and Tony Locantro, The Scarecrow Press, Lanham MD (2008).

External links
 Rostropovich Vishnevskaya Foundation
 Home-museum of Leopold and Mstislav Rostropovich
 Mstislav Rostropovich: Cellist, Conductor, Humanitarian Cellist Arash Amini shares his personal experiences with Slava, a feature from the Bloomingdale School of Music (October 2007)
 "Why the cello is a hero", interview with The Daily Telegraph
 Interview by Tim Janof
 Famous People: Then and Now article and interview at Azerbaijan International (Winter 1999)
 Intellectual Responsibility. When Silence Is Not Golden: Conversations with Mstislav Rostropovich, another Azerbaijan International interview (Summer 2005)
 Hearing Mstislav Rostropovich  survey of Rostropovich recordings, by Jens F. Laurson (WETA, May 4, 2007)
 1987 Presidential Medal of Freedom Recipients 
 The first Prague Spring International Cello Competition in 1950 in photographs, documents and reminiscences 
 National Symphony Orchestra Pays Homage to Rostropovich, WQXR Live Broadcast, Spring for Music Festival, Carnegie Hall, New York (May 11, 2013)
 Interview with Mstislav Rostropovich by Bruce Duffie, April 30, 2004
 Playing Brahms
 Conference in Brescia, june 4, 2003 ed. by Carlo Bianchi

1927 births
2007 deaths
20th-century cellists
20th-century Russian conductors (music)
20th-century Russian male musicians
Azerbaijani emigrants to Russia
Benjamin Britten
Burials at Novodevichy Cemetery
Commanders of the Order of Cultural Merit (Monaco)
Commanders of the Order of Isabella the Catholic
Commanders of the Order of Merit of the Grand Duchy of Luxembourg
Commanders of the Order of Merit of the Republic of Poland
Commanders of the Order of Saint-Charles
Commanders of the Order of the Dannebrog
Commanders of the Order of the Liberator General San Martin
Commanders of the Order of the Netherlands Lion
Commanders of the Order of the Phoenix (Greece)
Commandeurs of the Ordre des Arts et des Lettres
Conductors (music) awarded knighthoods
Deaths from cancer in Russia
Deaths from colorectal cancer
Defenders of the White House (1991)
Deutsche Grammophon artists
EMI Classics and Virgin Classics artists
Erato Records artists
Ernst von Siemens Music Prize winners
Grammy Award winners
Grand Crosses of the Order of Merit of the Republic of Hungary (civil)
Grand Crosses of the Order of Saint James of the Sword
Grand Officers of the National Order of the Cedar
Grand Officers of the Order of Merit of the Italian Republic
Grand Officiers of the Légion d'honneur
HIV/AIDS activists
Honorary Knights Commander of the Order of the British Empire
Honorary Members of the Royal Academy of Music
Honored Artists of the RSFSR
Kennedy Center honorees
Knights of the Order of the Lion of Finland
Lenin Prize winners
Moscow Conservatory alumni
Musicians from Baku
National Symphony Orchestra
Officers Crosses of the Order of Merit of the Federal Republic of Germany
People denaturalized by the Soviet Union
People's Artists of Russia
People's Artists of the USSR
Presidential Medal of Freedom recipients
Recipients of the Austrian Cross of Honour for Science and Art, 1st class
Recipients of the Four Freedoms Award
Recipients of the Heydar Aliyev Order
Recipients of the Istiglal Order
Recipients of the Léonie Sonning Music Prize
Recipients of the Order "For Merit to the Fatherland", 1st class
Recipients of the Order of Brilliant Star
Recipients of the Order of Isabella the Catholic
Recipients of the Order of the Lithuanian Grand Duke Gediminas
Recipients of the Order of the Rising Sun, 2nd class
Recipients of the Praemium Imperiale
Royal Philharmonic Society Gold Medallists
Russian classical cellists
Russian exiles
Russian male conductors (music)
Russian music educators
Soviet classical cellists
Soviet conductors (music)
Soviet defectors to the United States
Soviet music educators
Stalin Prize winners
State Prize of the Russian Federation laureates
UNESCO Goodwill Ambassadors
Wolf Prize in Arts laureates